The 5th Maya Awards was an awarding ceremony presented by the Maya Channel Magazine, giving recognition to the Thai entertainment industry in the fields of music, film, television and drama for their achievements in the year 2019.

The awards night was held at the CDC Crystal Grand Ballroom, Bangkok, Thailand on Thursday, 19 September 2019.

Awards 
Below are the awardees:

Television networks and personalities

Television

Movies

Music

Special awards

References 

2019
Maya